Daan Heymans (born 15 June 1999) is a Belgian professional footballer who plays as an attacking midfielder for Charleroi.

Club career
On 27 January 2022, he joined Charleroi on a 1.5-year loan with an option to buy.

On 3 July 2022, Heymans moved to Charleroi on a permanent basis and signed a three-year contract.

References

External links

1999 births
Living people
Belgian footballers
Belgium youth international footballers
K.V.C. Westerlo players
S.K. Beveren players
Lommel S.K. players
Venezia F.C. players
R. Charleroi S.C. players
Belgian Pro League players
Challenger Pro League players
Serie A players
Belgian expatriate footballers
Expatriate footballers in Italy
Belgian expatriate sportspeople in Italy
Association football midfielders